Captain Edward Calcott Pryce CBE (1885 – 20 October 1972), was a British Solicitor and Liberal Party politician.

Background
Pryce was the son of David Pryce, of Guilsfield. He was educated at Welshpool and Aberystwyth. In 1911 he married Sylvia Middleton of Arbroath, Scotland. He was awarded the OBE in 1940 and the CBE in 1957.

Professional career
Pryce qualified as a solicitor in 1909. He served in the European War of 1914–18, and the War of 1939–45. In 1954 he was appointed the Sheriff, of the City of London. In 1956 he was appointed the High Sheriff of Montgomeryshire.

Political career
Pryce unsuccessfully contested the 1910 London County Council election as a Progressive Party candidate in Hackney North. He was National Liberal candidate for the Ludlow division of Shropshire at the 1922 General Election. After that election, when the 1923 Ludlow by-election occurred, following the mood around the country, the National Liberals and Liberals in Ludlow united behind his candidature and he ran as a united Liberal candidate. Although he finished a strong second, he did not run for election again.

Electoral record

References

1885 births
1972 deaths
Liberal Party (UK) parliamentary candidates
British Army personnel of World War I
British Army personnel of World War II
Commanders of the Order of the British Empire
Royal Field Artillery officers
Welsh solicitors